A volcano deity is a deification of a volcano.

Volcano gods include:
Vulcan, in ancient Roman religion and myth, the god of fire including the fire of volcanoes, deserts, metalworking, and the forge.
Rūaumoko, in Māori mythology, god of earthquakes, volcanoes and seasons.
Pele, in the Hawaiian religion, goddess of volcanoes and fire and the creator of the Hawaiian Islands.
Lalahon, in Philippine mythology, Goddess of fire, volcanoes and harvest.
Kan-Laon, Visayan god of time associated with the volcano Kanlaon
Hephaestus, Greek god of blacksmiths, metalworking, carpenters, craftsmen, artisans, sculptors, metallurgy, fire, and volcanoes.
Gugurang, in Philippine mythology, Bicolano god of fire and volcanoes who lives inside Mayon Volcano which erupts whenever he's enraged
Guayota, Guanche, malignant deity which lived inside the Teide volcano.
Aganjú, Yoruban deity, Orisha of volcanoes, the wilderness and rivers.
Aganju, in Cuba, is a volcano deity for the practitioners of the Lucumi, Santeria religion.
Yahweh, in pre-Judaic Hebrew religion. Some scholars (for example, Martin Noth in his Exodus: A Commentary and Jack Miles in his Pulitzer Prize-winning God: A Biography) suggest that the ancient Hebrews worshipped or associated their god with a volcano.

See also
Mother Earth
List of nature deities

References 

Volcano deities